Beykoz Arena is a stadium that is currently under construction in Beykoz, Turkey. It was expected to open to the public in 2015 and have a capacity of 10,000 spectators.  It will be the new home of Beykozspor of the TFF Third League. It will replace the club's current home, Beykoz Stadyumu.

References

Football venues in Turkey
Stadiums under construction
Sports venues in Istanbul
Buildings and structures under construction in Turkey